Panic is an American teen drama streaming television series created and written by Lauren Oliver based on her 2014 novel of the same name. The series stars Olivia Welch, Mike Faist, and Jessica Sula. The series premiered on Amazon Prime Video on May 28, 2021. In August 2021, the series was canceled after one season.

Premise
In the summer after their senior year, 23 graduates participate in the annual Panic competition. Winning Panic with a cash prize of $50,000 will allow them to escape their small Texas town of Carp. After the rules change, however, they must decide what risks they will take to escape their home town.

Cast and characters

Main

 Olivia Welch as Heather Nill, a recent high school graduate who participates in Panic at the last minute, when her mom spends the tuition Heather saved. She lives in a trailer.
 Mike Faist as Dodge Mason, the new guy in Carp, Texas who participates in Panic.
 Jessica Sula as Natalie Williams, Heather's best friend who plans to participate in Panic from the start, but teams up with her to win Panic after Heather joins
 Ray Nicholson as Ray Hall, a legacy participant of Panic as his older brother Luke won Panic few years ago, Heather's love interest
 Camron Jones as Bishop Moore, Heather's other best friend and love interest who watches Panic instead of participating. He comes from a wealthy family unlike most of his peers in Carp.
 Enrique Murciano as Sheriff James Cortez, the local sheriff, whose son died in previous year's Panic

Recurring

 Rachel Bay Jones as Sherri Nill, Heather's mother
 Nancy McKeon as Jessica Mason, Dodge's mother and Sheriff Cortez's mistress
 Todd Williams as Capt. John Williams, Natalie's father
 Lee Eddy as Sgt. Christine Langley, a police officer who investigates Panic
 David Thompson as Daniel Diggins, the host of this year's Panic	
 Jordan Elsass as Tyler Young, a Panic participant who is also a friend of Ray's and the town's local drug dealer
 Maya Hendricks as Sarah Miller, Ray's half-sister
 Cosme Flores as Drew Santiago, a Panic participant
 Leslie Ann Leal as Summer Calvo, Daniel's co-host and the scorekeeper of Panic
 Stephen Dinh as Troy Van, a Panic player
 Kariana Karhu as Lily Nill, Heather's younger sister
 Tatiana Roberts as Shawna Kenny, a Panic participant
 Bryce Cass as Adam Lyons, a Panic player
 Sharmita Bhattacharya as Leela Agerwal, Bishop's friend
 Nasir Villanueva as Hunt Kenny, Shawna's older brother who coaches her for Panic
 Ben Cain as George Moore, Bishop's father who is a Carp judge
 Chris Zurcher as Max Slinger, a local freelance photographer
 Bonnie Bedelia as Anne McCarthy, a woman who offers Heather a job to work on her farm
 Moira Kelly as Melanie Cortez, Sheriff Cortez's wife
 Tate Panovich as Myra Campbell, the best friend of Abby who died in last year's Panic
 Madison Ferris as Dayna Mason, Dodge's sister who is disabled due an accident
 Kerri Medders as Ruby Anne McDonough
 Walker Babington as Luke Hall, Ray's older brother

Episodes

Production

Development
On June 28, 2018, it was announced that Amazon Studios had given the project a pilot order as part of their new young adult slate. Lauren Oliver was attached to create and write the adaptation of her own novel, as well as executive produce under her overall deal with Amazon Studios under her production company Glasstown Entertainment. Other executive producers included Joe Roth and Jeff Kirschenbaum of Roth/Kirschenbaum Films and Adam Schroeder. On August 8, 2018, Leigh Janiak was announced to be directing and executive producing the pilot. On May 16, 2019, it was announced that Amazon had given the project a series order. On August 6, 2021, Amazon canceled the series after one season.

Casting
On August 28, 2018, Olivia Welch, Mike Faist, and Ashlei Sharpe Chestnut were cast in lead roles for the pilot. On October 4, 2018, Ray Nicholson, Will Chase, and Kevin Alves were cast as series regulars. On October 21, Jessica Sula, Enrique Murciano, Camron Jones were cast in main roles, replacing Sharpe Chestnut, Chase, and Alves respectively. Bonnie Bedelia, Moira Kelly, Nancy McKeon, and Rachel Bay Jones were also cast in recurring roles. Bryce Cass joined the recurring cast in November 2019, followed by Kerri Medders in January 2020.

Filming
Filming on the original pilot took place throughout September 2018 in Los Angeles. The full series began filming in late October 2019 in the Austin, Texas area.

Release
On April 5, 2021, it was announced that all 10 episodes of the series are scheduled to premiere on Amazon Prime Video on May 28, 2021.

Tie-in media
On May 11, 2021, Audible announced that it would release an original three-part spin-off audio novella entitled Panic: Ghosts and Legends, also written by series creator Lauren Oliver, on May 28, 2021, to coincide with the launch of the original television series on Prime Video. The audio series will feature the voices of cast members Olivia Welch, Camron Jones, and Ray Nicholson.

Reception
On Rotten Tomatoes, the series holds an approval rating of 65% based on 26 critic reviews, with an average rating of 6.7/10. The website's critical consensus reads, "It's completely preposterous and entirely too much, but Panic is never less than entertaining, no matter how far off the rails it flies." On Metacritic, it has a weighted average score of 54 out of 100, based on 10 critics, indicating "mixed or average reviews".

References

External links
 

2020s American teen drama television series
2021 American television series debuts
2021 American television series endings
Amazon Prime Video original programming
English-language television shows
Television series about teenagers
Television series based on American novels
Television series by Amazon Studios
Television shows filmed in Los Angeles
Television shows filmed in Texas
Television shows set in Texas